The 2014 PartyPoker.com World Grand Prix was the seventeenth staging of the World Grand Prix. It was played from 6–12 October 2014 at the Citywest Hotel in Dublin, Ireland. After discussion with broadcaster Sky, the semi-finals and final format were shortened to the best of 7 and best of 9 sets, instead of 9 and 11 sets respectively.

Phil Taylor was the defending champion having won his 11th Grand Prix title with a 6–0 defeat over Dave Chisnall, but he lost 3–1 to James Wade in the quarter-finals.

Michael van Gerwen won his second World Grand Prix title by defeating Wade 5–3 in the final.

Wade threw the second ever double-start nine-dart finish in his second round match against Robert Thornton. Incredibly, Thornton repeated the feat a few legs later with the two players becoming the first to both hit nine darters in the same match in the history of darts.

Prize money
The total prize money was increased to £400,000 after being £350,000 for the previous five editions of this event. The following is the breakdown of the fund:

Qualification
The field of 32 players were made up from the top 16 in the PDC Order of Merit on September 16. The remaining 16 places went to the top 14 non-qualified players from the ProTour Order of Merit and then to the top 2 non-qualified residents of the Republic of Ireland and Northern Ireland from the 2014 ProTour Order of Merit. The top eight players were seeded in the tournament.

Draw
The draw was made on 21 September 2014.

References

World Grand Prix (darts)
World Grand Prix
World Grand Prix (darts)
World Grand Prix (darts)
World Grand Prix (darts), 2014